The Puli was a microcar made in Hungary by HÓDGÉP of Hódmezővásárhely from 1986.

The car was 2.46 m long and was assembled using parts made by Ikarus, Škoda, Lada and Polski Fiat available at that time in the country. It was propelled by a Diesel engine of 4 kW, or an electric engine of 7.4 kW.

The body was made from reinforced glass fibre. It was intended to be exported mainly to France where no driving licence was needed to drive that category of vehicles. The company's profile was agricultural machinery building and did not survive the political-economical transition of Hungary to a market economy at the end of the 1980s.

The electric version was produced in 1991 under the name Puli Pinguin 4.

In 2006 the Puli returned under the ownership of Prokop Gábor. Prokop holds Puli and Wartburg trade marks.

See also
 Puli (dog breed)

External links 
 German web page about the electrical vehicle (Archived site)
(Hungarian) AUTÓNAVIGÁTÓR article
Automobile catalog page
Defunct motor vehicle manufacturers of Hungary
Microcars
Science and technology in Hungary
Cars introduced in 1986
Cars discontinued in 1998